Miss World Puerto Rico 2014, was the 41st edition of the Miss World Puerto Rico pageant. It was held in the Guaynabo School of Fine Arts Theatre in Guaynabo, Puerto Rico on August 13, 2014. Génesis Dávila of Arroyo, was crowned Miss World Puerto Rico 2014 by outgoing titleholder Nadyalee Torres López of Caguas. Génesis María Dávila Pérez represented Puerto Rico at Miss World 2014 which was held at ExCeL London in London, England, United Kingdom on December 14, 2014.

Results

Placements

Special Awards

Contestants 
Official 22 candidates of Miss World Puerto Rico 2014:
 Adjuntas - Wilmarie Rosado
 Arroyo - Génesis María Dávila Pérez
 Bayamón - Sherly Rivera
 Caguas - Lety Pérez
 Canóvanas - Shalymar Otero
 Carolina - Kassandra Meléndez
 Dorado - Rebeca Valentín
 Guayama - Génesis Santiago
 Guaynabo - Gabriela Pérez
 Gurabo - Noelia Hernández
 Isabela - Dalmar Ramos
 Juana Díaz - Sherlin Aguirre
 Juncos - Anne Alvarado
 Lajas - Julissanet Cruz
 Loíza - Cinderee Cruz
 Luquillo - Jehanna López
 Orocovis - Jelianie Hernández
 Ponce - Darli Arni Pacheco
 Río Grande - Lyannelys Rodríguez
 San Juan - Laura Irizarry
 Toa Baja - Franceska Toro
 Yabucoa - Tershya Soto

References

External links 

 
 Video of Miss World Puerto Rico 2014 crowning (in Spanish)

2014 in Puerto Rico
2014
2014 beauty pageants
Miss Puerto Rico